It Was Hot, We Stayed in the Water, sometimes shortened to It Was Hot, is the second studio album by American indie folk and indie rock band the Microphones. It was released by K Records on September 26, 2000. After Phil Elverum—the frontman, principal songwriter, and producer of the Microphones's albums—had gained a small following with 1999's Don't Wake Me Up, he recorded It Was Hot in Dub Narcotic Studio in Olympia, Washington, between September  1999 and March 2000. The album was recorded on analogue tape; Elverum embraced the medium's technical imperfections. The album was described as indie rock, lo-fi, and indie pop and was inspired by Elverum's visits to the ocean. As a whole, the album centers on the theme of water, while its lyricism is heavily themed on nature. The 11-minute track "The Glow" acts as the album's climax and introduces the concept of the "glow", which was explored in more depth on 2001's The Glow Pt. 2.

It Was Hot received positive reviews from Pitchfork, AllMusic, and NME. Pitchfork listed the album at number seven in their "Top 20 Albums of 2000". The album received more reviews following its 2013 reissue, including positive reviews from PopMatters, Consequence of Sound, and Treblezine. The album is frequently compared to, and commonly said to be overshadowed by, The Glow Pt. 2.

Background and recording 

Phil Elverum—the frontman of the Microphones—released Don't Wake Me Up in 1999. The album was recorded using low-fidelity studio equipment, setting "a new precedent" for K Records, since Elverum's production was perceived as high-quality despite technical limitations. As a result of Don't Wake Me Up, Elverum gained a small following, and K Records gained a greater trust in Elverum's musical abilities. Prior to It Was Hot release, Elverum released two seven-inch singles, "Moon Moon" and "Feedback (Life, Love, Loop)" as well as the extended play Window:.

The album was recorded at Dub Narcotic Studio in Olympia, Washington. Elverum realized the tracks he was recording were appropriate for an album, rather than individual singles or compilation tracks, when about half of the tracks were finished. The album was recorded on analogue tape, which caused difficulty in re-recording takes, leading Elverum to avoid pursuing perfection. He described this self-imposed limitation as the "technological reason for pursuing charismatic sloppiness". The album makes little use of reverb effects. Elverum did not write all of the album's parts; as he explained, "there was definitely a sense of collaboration. [...] I had ideas, but then I was also open to other people's ideas". For example, while the credits did not separate individual contributions, Khaela Maricich wrote the track "(Something)". Elverum's lyrics were inspired by the poetic nature and mysteriousness of Will Oldham's lyrics. The album was recorded between September 24, 1999 and March 6, 2000, and was released on September 26, 2000 via K Records.

Music and themes 
Critics described It Was Hot, We Stayed in the Water as an indie rock, lo-fi, and indie pop album.

The album's lyricism is themed heavily on nature, influenced by Elverum's home town being in the Pacific Northwest. Elverum explained, "when I was 21, [...] using these big, huge natural world metaphors to try and tell my own stories, I think I couldn't see outside of it. [...] It was like my only vocabulary." The album was the first in a trilogy of albums themed on nature: It Was Hot explored the theme of water; The Glow, Pt. 2 represented fire and air, and Mount Eerie represented rock. During recording, Elverum frequently visited the ocean in and around Westport, Washington, contributing to the album's theme of the ocean, lakes, and swimming. The album introduced the concept of the "glow" on the 11-minute track "The Glow"; the concept was explored further in The Glow, Pt. 2. Elverum described the "glow" as a "glowing window that you see as you are freezing to death in the snow, or the light you go into supposedly when you die".

The opening track, "The Pull", begins with an acoustic guitar that rhythmically pans between the left and right speakers. The acoustic guitar later gives way to a dynamic shift: a burst of noisy guitars and reverbed snare drums, described by Matt LeMay of Pitchfork as a "sonic blast". LeMay also wrote, "despite the dissonance and the atypical song structure, the track never breaks down into complete anarchy". According to Adam Nelson of The Line of Best Fit, the lyrics of the track are about being free from a physical form; Nelson wrote that the track "makes death into an absolving liberation". The brief "Ice" begins with a similar blast of noise and percussion before winding down to an acoustic section. The track "Sand" is a cover of a 1993 Eric's Trip song of the same name. The cover, described by LeMay as "otherworldly", uses multiple layers of vocal harmonies and instrumentation. "Sand" ends abruptly, with the sound of a tape reel running out.
 
The 11-minute "The Glow", which acts as the album's climax, is made of separate segments, disjointedly connected. "The Glow" varies in sound fidelity, and uses elements of noise and drones. The track ends softly, with organs and emotional vocals from Elverum. Neil Kelly of PopMatters described the track as having an "epic genre-bending strut". "Karl Blau", in the style of 1950s pop, was partly inspired by a dream Elverum had about one of his musical collaborators, Karl Blau. Drum solos solely comprise the three-minute track "Drums", described by Sputnikmusic's joshuatree as a "cacophony". "The Gleam" is a pop song filled with noisy audio feedback; Elverum's vocals are barely audible amid the noise. "The Gleam" uses drones similar to "The Glow". "Between Your Ear and the Other Ear" uses elements of freak folk and audio feedback. The album's closer, "Organs", uses a swell of guitars and keyboards, described by LeMay as "ominous".

Critical reception

Contemporaneous 
In Heather Phares of AllMusic's undated review, they said the band "presents delicate, almost folky melodies wrapped up in and surrounded by waves of droning, distorted guitars and organs". Phares compared tracks from the album to those of other artists, but affirmed that the band's similarities "feel like tributes", not plagiarism. In Matt LeMay of Pitchfork review at the time of the album's release, it was rated 9.2 out of 10. LeMay praised the album's originality and how it broke rock music's conventions, providing an "element of surprise" he found missing in rock. Pitchfork later listed the album at number seven in their year-end "Top 20 Albums of 2000".

Retrospective 
Sputnikmusic's joshuatree reviewed the album in 2008, praised the "unpredictable nature of the album", and called it Phil Elverum's second-best album, after The Glow pt. 2. Multiple publications released reviews of the album following its 2013 reissue. Neil Kelly of PopMatters wrote "in hindsight, it really is a miracle that music with these kinds of dynamics would see the daylight". Kelly praised the album for its sonic diversity, and for the production of "The Glow"; he called the album a "feast of inspiration to revisit time and time again." Spectrum Culture Joe Clinkenbeard described the album as similar to Elverum's other work in that it "thrives on chaos, quiet and in juxtaposing the two". Steven Arroyo of Consequence of Sound wrote, "The Microphones sound is inseparable from nature and the outdoors [...] and so too is It Was Hot from the magical glowing buzz of a summer night swim, about which Elverum repeatedly sings." Paul Pearson of Treblezine noted the album's recording imperfections and its intimacy. Pearson wrote, "[the album] is a study in subjection and liberation, crossing through warmed tides to ice and back again." According to Daniel Mescher of Colorado Public Radio, the album is "widely regarded as [an] indie pop classic". Patrick Lyons of Stereogum reviewed the album in 2020, comparing "The Pull"'s guitar opening to the opening of the then-newly released Microphones in 2020. According to Lyons, the album solidified the sound of Don't Wake Me Up without giving up its "roughshod charm". Martin Douglas of KEXP reviewed the album in 2022, noting Elverum's boyish voice, the album's intimacy, and the inspiration the album had on "any weirdo singer/songwriter crafting dense musical epics in their basement since the turn of the century".

It Was Hot, We Stayed in the Water is commonly described as overshadowed by the more popular The Glow Pt. 2. Douglas wrote, "Not many artists can say they wrote their masterpiece [It Was Hot] and then a year later, wrote another masterpiece [The Glow, Pt. 2]". Spectrum Culture Joe Clinkenbeard called The Glow Pt. 2 the album's "better known sibling" and said It Was Hot "was given little chance to sit with listeners". Joshuatree described The Glow Pt. 2 as Elverum's "peak", but still called It Was Hot its "just-as-pretty twin" with "too little attention directed towards" it. According to Patrick Lyons of Steregum, It Was Hot "lacks the vast scope and deep emotional core of its follow-up" but it "unfairly lived in the shadow" of The Glow Pt. 2. Elverum said, "I mostly don't pay that much attention to how the stuff I've made is ranked in comparison to itself".

Track listing 
All tracks written and performed by the Microphones unless noted.

Personnel 
Adapted from the album's liner notes.
 Phil Elverum 
 Khaela Maricich
 Mirah
 Jenn Kliese
 Anna Oxygen
 Karl Blau
 Jason Wall
 Calvin Johnson

Release history

Notes

References

2000 albums
The Microphones albums
K Records albums